The 1951 National League Division Two was the sixth post-war season of the second tier of motorcycle speedway in Great Britain.

Summary
The League was extended again with 18 teams starting the season. New entrants were Motherwell Eagles and there were again three teams promoted from Division Three - the champions Oxford Cheetahs, third place finishers Leicester Hunters and Liverpool Chads (despite finishing 8th). Plymouth Devils moved back down in the opposite direction.

Norwich Stars retained their title. However after the season had finished a fourth rider in five years was killed at their Firs Stadium. 21-year-old Bob Howes died after hitting the fence during a training practice race on 10 November 1951.

Southampton Saints and Sheffield Tars resigned in mid-season and their records were expunged.

Final table

Top Five Riders (League only)

National Trophy Stage Two
 For Stage One - see Stage One
 For Stage Three - see Stage Three

The 1951 National Trophy was the 14th edition of the Knockout Cup. The Trophy consisted of three stages; stage one was for the third division clubs, stage two was for the second division clubs and stage three was for the top tier clubs. The winner of stage one would qualify for stage two and the winner of stage two would qualify for the third and final stage. Norwich won stage two and therefore qualified for stage three.

Second Division qualifying first round

Second Division Qualifying Second round

Second Division Qualifying quarterfinals

Second Division Qualifying semifinals

Second Division Qualifying final
First leg

Second leg

See also
List of United Kingdom Speedway League Champions
Knockout Cup (speedway)

References

Speedway National League Division Two
1951 in British motorsport
1951 in speedway